Orinella africana is a species of sea snail, a marine gastropod mollusk in the family Pyramidellidae, the pyrams and their allies.

Description
The light-brown shell has an elongate-conic shape. The length measures 6.1 mm. The two whorls of the protoconch are small. They are planorboid, having their axis at right angles to that of the succeeding turns, in the first of which they are very slightly immersed. The eight whorls of the teleoconch are almost flat, and are feebly shouldered at the summit. They are marked by very fine incremental hues, and exceedingly fine spiral striatums. The suture  is moderately constricted. The periphery of the body whorl is  well rounded. The base of the shell is short, well rounded, and narrowly umbilicated. It is marked like the spire. The aperture  is subquadrate. The posterior angle is acute. The outer lip is thin. The inner lip  is almost vertical, strongly reflected, and provided with a 
fold a little anterior to its insertion.

Distribution
This marine species occurs off Port Alfred, South Africa.

References

External links
 To World Register of Marine Species

Pyramidellidae
Gastropods described in 1915